Spider-Geddon is a 2018 comic book limited series and crossover storyline published by Marvel Comics featuring multiple alternative versions of Spider-Man that had appeared in various media, and his supporting cast. In this sequel to Spider-Verse, the Inheritors have found a way out of the decimated world they were imprisoned on and are now determined to take their revenge on the Spider-Army and feed on them once again.

Publication history
The story was first announced with blank teaser posters, with the tagline "Spider-Geddon is nigh". It was eventually revealed that the story would feature several alternate versions of Spider-Man and his related characters, like the previous crossover event, Spider-Verse. The creative team, writer Christos Gage and artist Jorge Molina, was announced on June 29 in a press release. Editor Nick Lowe explained that "Spider-Verse took the multitudes of Spider-Characters and put them all on the same stage and we’ve been playing with it ever since. Spider-Geddon straps dynamite to that stage and blows it to smithereens. The most dangerous spider-villain ever, Morlun, and his family of Inheritors were trapped in the perfect prison at the end of Spider-Verse. But like in any super hero story, there’s always a way out and you won’t believe how these Spider-Eaters get out. But they’re out and they want revenge." 

Gage had previously worked for Dan Slott in the Spider-Verse comic, and became the lead writer because Slott was busy writing the Tony Stark: Iron Man and Fantastic Four comic books. The publishers also clarified in the New York Comic Con that the lead character would be Miles Morales, and not Peter Parker.

The  event began with a 5-issue Edge of Spider-Geddon miniseries, featuring side stories of alternate versions of Spider-Man. Spider-Geddon #0 introduced the character from the Spider-Man 2018 video game into comics, and set up the plot for the game's sequel. Both the video game and the comic are written by Gage, who said that "Since I have been writing for the video game for the past three years (along with the ever-amazing Dan Slott, Jon Paquette, and Ben Arfmann), it seemed like a perfect time to bring that Pete into the mix". The first illustrated teaser poster featured a black silhouette of a Spider-Man character, who was revealed to be the one from the game in a later full version of the poster.

Superior Octopus #1 introduced the main theme, and the main Spider-Geddon started to be published after it. One of the tie-in comics is a third volume of the Spider-Gwen comic book, named Spider-Gwen: Ghost-Spider. It is written by novelist Seanan McGuire and pictured by artist Rosi Kampe.

Plot
Superior Octopus establishes himself as a local hero of San Francisco. He has invented a machine using technology of the Inheritors that makes clones of himself, allowing his consciousness to jump to one of those in case of death. Spider-UK, Spider-Woman of Earth-982, Spider-Gwen of Earth-65, Doctor Octopus (Octavia Octo) of Earth-1104, Spider-Ham, Spider-Punk of Earth-138, and Spider-Man Noir gather at the lab to warn him of the risk. Morlun, Verna and Jennix emerge from one of the machines and kill Spider-Man Noir and Spider-UK.  Morlun departs to target Peter Parker.

As the Inheritors continue to emerge, the spiders suggest that Octavius trigger the base's self-destruct, with Spider-Gwen apparently sacrificing herself to trap the Inheritors in the base as the others retreat. With the Inheritors now restricted to the bodies they have at the moment, Octavius and Spider-Punk suggest killing the Inheritors while Miles, Spider-Woman and Spider-Ham vow to adhere to their old philosophies. Octavius returns to the Superior Spider-Man costume, and both groups start to recruit allies from alternate dimensions. Verna takes a detour in her mission where she absorbs the Master Weaver's lifeforce. Spider-Gwen finds herself on Earth-3109.

Arriving on Earth-51778, Superior Spider-Man and Spider-Man of Earth-1048 warn Takuya Yamashiro of the Inheritors. On Earth-50101, Miles Morales and Pavitr Prabhakar talk about Superior Spider-Man's group plan to kill the Inheritors as they stop some robbers. Afterwards, they meet up with Spider-Man and Spinneret from Earth-18119, Spider-Ham, Silk, SP//dr, and Spider-Pete and Spider-Ben of Earth-91918 as there are talks to get Earth-616 Peter Parker. Back on Earth-51778, Superior Spider-Man, Spider-Man of Earth-1048, Spiders-Man of Earth-11580, Takuya Yamashiro, Spider-Man of Earth-138, Octavia Otto, Web-Slinger of Earth-31913, and Norman Osborn of Earth-44145 talk about how to destroy the Inheritors while Kaine's group (consisting of himself, Ashley Barton, Jessica Drew, Astro-Spider, and Spider-Kid) pursues Verna before she can find the crystal containing Solus' soul. Octavia has found that Ben Reilly has followed them as he is familiar with New U Technology's cloning technology. Superior Spider-Man gets a transmission from Miles' group stating that they are heading to New U Technologies. At New U Technologies, Solus' body is restored as Daemos, Brix, Bora, and Jennix await Verna's return with the crystal. As Jennix tries to speed up the construction of the body banks, Spider-Ham reports back to the rest of his group. Before Miles can detonate the support beams, they are attacked by Brix, Bora, and Daemos. As Bora works to drain the life force from Miles, SP//dr is advised by Miles to activate the detonators in her suit. SP//dr reluctantly does so until Superior Spider-Man's group arrives where a retreat is issued after Superior Spider-Man gets analysis on Solus' body bank. During the retreat, Superior Spider-Man learns that Jennix is having a hard time with New U Technologies' cloning technology. Norman Osborn of Earth-44145 has a talk with Spiders-Man of Earth-11580 about his vision on the Web of Life and Destiny as they have a secret strategy to keep the Inheritors on Earth-616.

Spider-Woman makes it back to Earth-616 with the crystal containing Solus' lifeforce. Unfortunately, she arrives at New U Technologies where she is grabbed by Jennix. After being hit by Spider-Woman's venom blasts, Jennix instructs Daemos to share his food with Brix and Bora. As Daemos starts to feed off of Spider-Woman, she states that she got her powers from a radiation blast which makes her unpalatable to the Inheritors. Jennix instructs Daemos to place Spider-Woman in stasis so that Jennix can study her later. Jennix then uses the crystal in the cloning machine enabling Solus to live again. Solus plans to reward his children with a feast like never before. Meanwhile, on Earth-13, Miles Morales informs Spider-Man of Earth-1048 that this world is where the Spider-Army first fought Solus and killed the Enigma Force-powered Spider-Man. Superior Spider-Man explains to Norman Osborn of Earth-44145 that they are on Earth-13 to analyze the Enigma Force. Spider-Man of Earth-18199 advises Spider-Man of Earth-1048 to not let his Mary Jane get away as Spider-Man of Earth-1048 compares Miles with his world's version of Miles. Spider-Punk of Earth-138 informs the rest of Superior Spider-Man's group that Solus lives again. Norman Osborn of Earth-44145 takes Spiders-Man of Earth-11580 to Loomworld which Norman saw in his vision. They find Karn dead and the Web of Life and Destiny unguarded. Spiders-Man of Earth-11580 has his spiders eat Karn's corpse as Norman Osborn of Earth-44145 plans to have no Web of Life and Destiny to keep inter-dimensional travel from happening. Aboard Leopardon, Superior Spider-Man's group are analyzing possible recruits like a Spider-Cop and a Tyrannosaurus. Before any new recruits can be obtained, the spider-watches malfunction because of what is happening on Loomworld. As Spiders-Man of Earth-11580 sends his spiders to different Earths, Norman Osborn of Earth-44145 blows up the Web of Life and Destiny. Back on Leopardon, Superior Spider-Man figures out that someone has trapped them on Earth-616 with the Inheritors. As Pavitr and Octavia work on a way to fix it, Superior Spider-Man takes Ben Reilly to the Transamerica Pyramid where they find that Jennix has cobbled together more cloning vats. Superior Spider-Man knocks out Ben Reilly and hands him over to the Inheritors as part of a deal that includes Solus sparing Earth-616. Solus agrees to show Earth-616 mercy with no promises towards anyone who displeases the Inheritors. As Superior Spider-Man leaves, the Inheritors close in on an unconscious Ben Reilly. Miles Morales is able to use the Enigma Energy fragments to send out a message as an angered Enigma Force arrives.

The Enigma Force states that it is a tool to be used for humans who are worthy. When it asks if they have all made unforgivable mistakes, those on Miles' team face their regrets while Miles states that the Inheritors killed a version of Captain Universe from Earth-13. As Solus dismisses Superior Spider-Man, Spider-Man of Earth-1048 is revealed to have secretly followed Superior Spider-Man and thinks that he has betrayed him. Ben Reilly awakens as Daemos advises Jennix to eat him. As Jennix starts to feed off of Ben Reilly's lifeforce, he gets the knowledge of Ben's sacrifice to save Spider-Man from Green Goblin, Miles Warren recreating him, and how New U Technologies' cloning banks work. The memories start to affect Jennix. As Spider-Man of Earth-1048 learns that this was part of Ben Reilly and Superior Spider-Man's plans, they are attacked by the Inheritors. As Daemos goes on the attack, Solus tells him to stand aside as he hasn't fed on a Spider yet. Just then, Solus is shot in the back by Miles Morales who was transformed into Captain Universe by the Enigma Force as Spider-Punk mentions that Jennix has been driven crazy and Verna is missing. The Captain Universe-powered Miles goes on the attack vowing not to make the same mistake as the Spider-Man of Earth-13. Leopardon shows up at New U Technologies and Takuya Yamashiro has it transform until Daemos attacks. Superior Spider-Man and Octavia Otto find Spider-Woman and free her where she mentions that Verna died on Earth-3145. As Superior Spider-Man and Octavia Otto work on reviving Ben Reilly, the other spider-powered groups fight the Inheritors. Just then, Spiderling of Earth-18119 arrives with Anya Corazon and Spider-Woman of Earth-982 as Spiderling states that she is a Pattern-Maker. The three Spider-Women use the Web of Life and Destiny fragments to get strong enough to take down Brix and Bora while Spider-Woman of Earth-982 fights Daemos. Spider-Gwen in her "Ghost Spider" alias show up with more spider-powered characters including the main 616 Spider-Man who defeated Morlun. 616 Spider-Man catches up to Superior Spider-Man and Octavia Otto who have managed to revive Ben Reilly to "factory settings." After some persuasion, Spider-Man allows Superior Spider-Man to come up with his plan as the Captain Universe-powered Miles uses Leopardon's Sword Vigor attack on Solus, Brix, Bora, and Daemos. Later, Superior Spider-Man reveals to the others that he revived the Inheritors as babies as Spider-Man arranged for the same thing to be done to Morlun so the Inheritors can grow up without abusive parentage and not become supervillains. Spider-Ma'am takes in the baby Inheritors as foster children. As every spider-powered character returns to their world, Spider-Woman of Earth-982 mentions that there was no Other this time, but Annie tells her there is. On Earth-982, Peter Parker's hand rises from the grave. Spider-Man and Miles tell Superior Octopus that he should call them if a threat arises for him no matter from whence they came. The final scene shows Norman Osborn of Earth-44145 in an unknown location holding a DNA container.

Issues

Lead-up
 Edge of Spider-Geddon #1–4
 Superior Octopus #1

Main plot
 Spider-Geddon #0–5

Tie-ins
 Peter Parker, The Spectacular Spider-Man #311–313
 Spider-Force #1–3
 Spider-Geddon Handbook #1
 Spider-Girls #1–3
 Spider-Gwen: Ghost Spider #1–3
 Superior Spider-Man Vol. 2 #1
 Vault of Spiders #1–2

Aftermath 
 Spider-Gwen: Ghost Spider #4

Collected editions

Reception
The series as a whole received mixed reviews, with critics criticizing the plot, treatment of characters, and pacing. Critics noted that the lack of the main Spider-Man made the story feel hollow. However, critics praised the artstyle as well as the relationship between Insomniac's Spider-Man and Superior Spider-Man. According to Comicbook Roundup, the series has an average score of 7.1 out of 10.

According to Comic Book Roundup, Spider-Geddon Issue 0 received a score of 6.7 out of 10 based on 11 reviews.

According to Comic Book Roundup, Issue 1 received a score of 7.5 out of 10 based on 16 reviews.

According to Comic Book Roundup, Issue 2 received a score of 7.4 out of 10 based on 8 reviews.

According to Comic Book Roundup, Issue 3 received a score of 7.2 out of 10 based on 11 reviews.

According to Comic Book Roundup, Issue 4 received a score of 7.4 out of 10 based on 9 reviews.

According to Comic Book Roundup, Issue 5 received a score of 6.6 out of 10 based on 10 reviews.

References

External links
 

Comics about parallel universes
Spider-Man storylines